Alexandra Maria Guarnaschelli (born June 20, 1969) is an American chef, cookbook author, and television personality. She currently serves as an executive chef at New York City's Butter restaurant and was executive chef at The Darby restaurant before its closing. Guarnaschelli had studied cooking extensively in France.

She appears as a television personality on the Food Network shows The Kitchen, Chopped (as a judge), Iron Chef America, All Star Family Cook-off, Guy's Grocery Games (as both a judge and a competitor), and The Best Thing I Ever Ate. She hosts Alex's Day Off, The Cooking Loft, and  Supermarket Stakeout. In 2012, she won that season of The Next Iron Chef: Redemption. In January 2022, she premiered her newest show, Alex vs. America, also on Food Network.  

In 2013, Guarnaschelli's first cookbook was published. Old-School Comfort Food: The Way I Learned to Cook mixes autobiographical details with favorite recipes from her professional life that she adapted for the home.

Early life
Guarnaschelli is the daughter (and only child) of cookbook editor Maria Guarnaschelli and John Guarnaschelli. She was born in St. Louis, Missouri, but the  family moved to New York City when she was just a few days old. 

Guarnaschelli's culinary experience started while watching her mother test numerous recipes at home while editing cookbooks.

She graduated from Barnard College in 1991 with a degree in art history.

Career
In 1991, she worked for minimum wage in a restaurant, An American Place, for one year. 

Guarnaschelli worked under Larry Forgione (whose son is Iron Chef Marc Forgione), and then at a number of restaurants in France, New York and Los Angeles, including Guy Savoy's La Butte Chaillot. She also worked at Daniel Boulud's eponymous restaurant and Joachim Splichal's Patina before becoming the executive chef at Butter. She was executive chef at The Darby restaurant before its closing. She chairs the Museum of Food and Drink's Culinary Council.

Television appearances

Guarnaschelli was a competitor on The Food Network's Iron Chef America, taking on Cat Cora in the 2007 "Farmers' Market Battle."  Cora won the challenge.  Guarnaschelli has since appeared as a judge on the program. In 2011, she competed in the fourth season of The Next Iron Chef, where she placed as the third runner-up.  She also competed on the Food Network Challenge Ultimate Thanksgiving Feast episode and lost the competition. After competing in the fourth season of The Next Iron Chef, Guarnaschelli became a sous chef to Iron Chef Geoffrey Zakarian.

In 2008, she became the host of The Food Network's The Cooking Loft with Alex Guarnaschelli, in which the chef teaches a small group of students how to construct new variations of classic dishes.

Guarnaschelli has been a judge on Food Network's competition show Food Network Challenge, and frequently appears as a judge on Food Network's cooking competition show Chopped, Cooks Vs. Cons, Young and Hungry, and Guy's Grocery Games, as had appeared on the Food series The Best Thing I Ever Ate.

Guarnaschelli starred in the Food Network television show Alex's Day Off, which premiered in October 2009. It ran for three seasons and 32 episodes

She competed in season 5 of The Next Iron Chef: Redemption, winning in the final Kitchen Stadium showdown against chef Amanda Freitag. Her debut challenge as an Iron Chef on Iron Chef America aired on December 30, 2012.

Guarnaschelli made two guest appearances: first on the Nickelodeon television show Nicky, Ricky, Dicky & Dawn, on the one-hour special "Go Hollywood" on November 25, 2015 and later on the ABC television show The Real O'Neals in the episode "The Real Thanksgiving" on November 15, 2016.

She later made three appearances: as a judge in episode five of Iron Chef Gauntlet, where chef Gruenberg was eliminated before the final showdown in episode six "The Gauntlet". on the Food Network's Beat Bobby Flay. She challenged Bobby with her signature lobster dish. She also won that challenge. She made a guest appearance on Billions and as a mentor on season 20 of Worst Cooks in America as the captain of the Blue Team, opposite Anne Burrell. Alex ultimately became the winning mentor.

In 2022, she premiered Alex vs. America, also on Food Network.

Personal life

On April 29, 2007, Guarnaschelli married Brandon Clark. The two met in 2006 at New York's Institute of Culinary Education while Alex was teaching a fish class. Their daughter, Ava, was born in July 2007.

The couple's marriage eventually ended, and in June 2020, Guarnaschelli announced her engagement to chef Michael Castellon, a Chopped winner who had proposed to her on her birthday over the weekend of June 19–20. In February 2022, it was announced that the couple ended their engagement.

Filmography

Bibliography

 Old School Comfort Food: The Way I Learned to Cook (Clarkson Potter, 2013) 
 The Home Cook (Clarkson Potter, 2017) 
 Cook With Me (Clarkson Potter, 2020)

References

External links
 
 Alex Guarnaschelli biography at Food Network. Archived from the original on January 1, 2014. Note; Virtually same content as at TheChefsConnection.com, cited above.

1969 births
Living people
Chefs from Missouri
Chefs from New York City
American television chefs
American women chefs
American gastronomes
American people of Italian descent
Food Network chefs
Reality cooking competition winners
Barnard College alumni
20th-century American women
21st-century American women